Nicolás Guillén Landrián (1938 in Camagüey, Cuba - July 23, 2003 in Miami, Florida) was a Cuban experimental filmmaker and painter.

Guillén was an accomplished filmmaker. He made a total of 13 documentaries, although they were heavily censored and prevented from being part of the Cuban film industry. In 1964, he was given a special award at the Krakow Film Festival for his film En un barrio viejo. In 1968, his documentary Coffea Arabiga featured the Beatles' song "The Fool on the Hill" as Fidel Castro appeared on screen. That same year, Guillén was accused of plotting to assassinate Castro. The Cuban government interrogated him for six months in Villa Marista. From 1970 to 1989, he was repeatedly jailed and institutionalized. He received at least eight treatments of electroconvulsive therapy, never under sedation. 

As painter, he taught René Portocarrero and Victor Miquel Moreno Piñeiro in painting.

In 1989, he was able to leave Cuba and lived the rest of his life in Miami, Florida. He died of cancer at Mercy Hospital in Miami.   After his death, his widow had his body flown from Miami and entombed in Colon Cemetery, Havana in Cuba. His uncle was Afro-Cuban poet Nicolás Guillén.  Filmmakers Victor R. Jiménez Sosa, and Jorge Egusquiza produced a biographical documentary of Nicolás Guillén Landrián in his own words, Nicolás: the end but not the end, by Coincident Productions (2005).

On 2013 J. Manuel L. Herrera directed "Remembering Nicolasito", and wrote Nicolas Guillen Landrian in 3D. This book was presented on the 30th Miami Book Fair International.

In 2014 Raydel Araoz and Julio Ramos directed "Retornar a La Habana con Guillén Landrián", a 35 min. documentary essay based on Ramos´extensive interview with Gretel Alfonso, Guillén Landrián's widow.

References

External links
 

Cuban documentary filmmakers
Cuban film directors
1938 births
2003 deaths
Deaths from cancer in Florida